Aldea del Obispo is a village and municipality in the province of Salamanca,  western Spain, part of the autonomous community of Castile-Leon.

Economy
The local economy is dominated by agriculture primarily the growth of herbs.

Immigration
Aldea del Obispo generated much emigration to Latin America. Many families well known today in Brazil and other Latin American countries hail from Aldea del Obispo. Among well known descendant of family originally from Aldea del Obispo is The Baron Camilo Agasim-Pereira of Fulwood and Dirleton, whose partenal great-grandparents Hemeterio and Maria Martin y Martin immigrated to Brazil in 1901 from the village they trace their roots in the village to Juan Calderon and Ana Sanchez who lived in the area around 1660.

References

External links
 https://web.archive.org/web/20060827191910/http://www.adicomt.com/comarca/municip/aldeaobi/pbl01.htm

Municipalities in the Province of Salamanca